Druzhelyubiye is a rural locality (a selo) in Rogachyovskoye Rural Settlement, Novousmansky District, Voronezh Oblast, Russia. The population was 204 as of 2010.

Geography 
Druzhelyubiye is located 17 km southeast of Novaya Usman (the district's administrative centre) by road. Tamlyk is the nearest rural locality.

References 

Rural localities in Novousmansky District